Hersey Township may refer to the following places in the United States:

 Hersey Township, Michigan
 Hersey Township, Nobles County, Minnesota

Township name disambiguation pages